The women's 4 × 100 metres relay at the 2018 Commonwealth Games, as part of the athletics programme, took place in the Carrara Stadium on 14 April 2018.

The English team set an English record of 42.46 seconds to defeat the defending Jamaicans. Long jumper Lorraine Ugen, who had not run a relay in four years, replaced heat runner Corinne Humphreys in the England set-up at 24 hours' notice following an injury to Humphreys, and successfully managed to hold off Olympic champion Elaine Thompson on the anchor leg.

Records
Prior to this competition, the existing world and Games records were as follows:

Schedule
The schedule was as follows:

All times are Australian Eastern Standard Time (UTC+10)

Results
With eight teams, the event was held as a straight final.

Final

References

Women's 4 x 100 metres relay
2018
2018 in women's athletics